Ceyx is an Old World genus of river kingfishers. These kingfishers are found from South East Asia to the Solomon Islands.

The genus was introduced by the French naturalist Bernard Germain de Lacépède in 1799, and derives its name from the Greek myth of Alcyone and Ceyx. The type species is the oriental dwarf kingfisher (Ceyx erithaca).

A molecular phylogenetic study of the alcedinine kingfishers published in 2007 found that the genera as then defined did not form monophyletic groups. The species were subsequently rearranged into four monophyletic genera. The little kingfisher, azure kingfisher, Bismarck kingfisher, silvery kingfisher and Indigo-banded kingfisher were moved from Alcedo to Ceyx.  All except one of the birds in the reconstituted genus have three rather than the usual four toes. The exception is the Sulawesi dwarf kingfisher which retains a vestigial fourth toe.

The Moluccan dwarf kingfisher (Ceyx lepidus) was previous named the variable dwarf kingfisher and included 15 recognised subspecies. A genetic study published in 2013 found that most of the subspecies had substantially diverged from one another. The species was therefore split and 12 of the subspecies were promoted to species status. At the same time the name was changed from the variable dwarf kingfisher to the Moluccan dwarf kingfisher.

The two African species in the genus  Ispidina were sometimes placed in this genus. Compared to the related species in the genus Alcedo they are more terrestrial.

There are 22 species in the genus:

 Oriental dwarf kingfisher, Ceyx erithaca
 Philippine dwarf kingfisher Ceyx melanurus
 Sulawesi dwarf kingfisher, Ceyx fallax
 Sangihe dwarf kingfisher, Ceyx sangirensis
 Moluccan dwarf kingfisher, Ceyx lepidus – previously named a subspecies of the "variable dwarf kingfisher"
 Dimorphic dwarf kingfisher,  Ceyx margarethae – previously a subspecies of the variable dwarf kingfisher
 Sula dwarf kingfisher,  Ceyx wallacii – previously a subspecies of the variable dwarf kingfisher
 Buru dwarf kingfisher,  Ceyx cajeli – previously a subspecies of the variable dwarf kingfisher
 Papuan dwarf kingfisher,  Ceyx solitarius – previously a subspecies of the variable dwarf kingfisher
 Manus dwarf kingfisher,  Ceyx dispar – previously a subspecies of the variable dwarf kingfisher
 New Ireland dwarf kingfisher,  Ceyx mulcatus – previously a subspecies of the variable dwarf kingfisher
 New Britain dwarf kingfisher,  Ceyx sacerdotis – previously a subspecies of the variable dwarf kingfisher
 North Solomons dwarf kingfisher,  Ceyx meeki – previously a subspecies of the variable dwarf kingfisher
 New Georgia dwarf kingfisher,  Ceyx collectoris – previously a subspecies of the variable dwarf kingfisher
 Malaita dwarf kingfisher,  Ceyx malaitae – previously a subspecies of the variable dwarf kingfisher
 Guadalcanal dwarf kingfisher,  Ceyx nigromaxilla – previously a subspecies of the variable dwarf kingfisher
 Makira dwarf kingfisher,  Ceyx gentianus – previously a subspecies of the variable dwarf kingfisher
 Indigo-banded kingfisher, Ceyx cyanopectus – previously in Alcedo
 Southern silvery kingfisher Ceyx argentatus – previously in Alcedo
 Northern silvery kingfisher Ceyx flumenicola – split from C. argentatus
 Azure kingfisher Ceyx azureus – previously in Alcedo
 Bismarck kingfisher Ceyx websteri – previously in Alcedo
 Little kingfisher Ceyx pusillus – previously in Alcedo

References

Sources

 
Alcedininae
Bird genera
Taxa named by Bernard Germain de Lacépède